Frank Simpson (born January 26, 1945) is an American politician who served in the Oklahoma Senate from the 14th district from 2010 to 2022. In 2022 he was term limited from the Oklahoma Legislature.

References

1945 births
Living people
Republican Party Oklahoma state senators
21st-century American politicians